Mido Hamada (born 1971) is an Egyptian-German actor in film, theatre and television.

Early life
He was born in Cairo, Egypt to an Egyptian family that moved to Germany, where he studied at the American Embassy School. He attended the Oxford School of Drama

Career
His roles include Ahmed Shah Massoud in the television mini-series The Path to 9/11 and smaller roles in the British television film Hannibal and the series Feel the Force. In 2004, he played in the film Sky Captain and the World of Tomorrow. In the 2011 film Unknown, Hamada played a Saudi sheikh involved in an assassination attempt at a Berlin hotel and in funding biotechnological research.

Hamada has also appeared in the Fox series 24 as Samir Mehran, a rogue intelligence agent from the fictional Middle Eastern country of Kamistan who assassinates its president Omar Hassan (Anil Kapoor). He served as the season's arch-villain for most of its episodes.

He appeared again in a Fox series on Terra Nova, where he portrayed Guzman, one of the colony security personnel and a trusted colleague to Commander Nathaniel Taylor.

In 2012, Hamada had a role in the Showtime series Homeland, playing a key member of a terrorist cell planning an attack on the United States. In The Situation, he played Zaid, an Iraqi photographer. He portrayed "The Butcher" in the film American Sniper. He also lent his voice for the video game Disney Infinity 3.0. In 2017, he played Eamonn, captain of the bodyguards of the Wizard of Oz, in Emerald City.

In 2019, Hamada played congressman Daniel Maloof in the fourth season of Veronica Mars, produced by Hulu. He has a role in the upcoming science fiction series Foundation.

Personal life
Hamada is fluent in German, English and Arabic. He now lives in London.

Filmography

Film

Television

Video games

References

External links

1971 births
Living people
Place of birth missing (living people)
Male actors from Cairo
Egyptian emigrants to Germany
German male actors

German people of Egyptian descent